Fernand Brichant (born 1 February 1895, date of death unknown) was a Belgian footballer. He played in two matches for the Belgium national football team in 1914.

References

External links
 

1895 births
Year of death missing
Belgian footballers
Belgium international footballers
Place of birth missing
Association football goalkeepers
Royal Léopold Club players